Chi Wanchun (born April 1946) is a retired general of the Chinese People's Liberation Army (PLA). He served as political commissar of the PLA General Armaments Department.

Biography
Born in Wendeng, Shandong, Chi graduated from the Harbin Institute of Military Engineering in 1970, majoring in aeronautic weapons. He joined the Chinese Communist Party in April 1971. In December 1986, he was the director of the political department affiliated with the Logistics Department of the Commission of Science, Technology and Industry for National Defense (COSTIND). In August 1988, he became vice political commissar of the Xi'an Satellite Control Center affiliated with COSTIND. In February 1993, he became political commissar of the Taiyuan Satellite Launch Center. He was promoted to vice director of the political department of COSTIND in 1995, and further promoted to director of the political department of the PLA General Armaments Department in January 1999. He became the political commissar of PLA National Defense University in June 1999. In October 2002, he became political commissar of the PLA General Armament Department. 

He attained the rank of major general in July 1993, lieutenant general in July 2000, and full general on June 24, 2006.

Chi was a member of the 16th and 17th Central Committee of the Chinese Communist Party.

References

1946 births
Living people
People's Liberation Army generals from Shandong
Politicians from Weihai
Chinese Communist Party politicians from Shandong
People's Republic of China politicians from Shandong
People from Wendeng